Grivița is a metro station in northern Bucharest. The station was opened on 1 March 2000 as part of the inaugural section of the line from Gara de Nord to 1 Mai, and is therefore one of the most modern stations in Bucharest. It is located near the Grivița railroad workshops.

References

Bucharest Metro stations
Railway stations opened in 2000
2000 establishments in Romania